Motorway 3 (A3), or the Central Greece motorway is a partially completed motorway in Greece. It will lead from the Motorway 1 near Lamia to the Motorway 2 near Grevena, passing Karditsa, Trikala and Kalambaka. It will carry the European route E65.

Upon completion, starting from the plain of Phthiotis near Lamia, it will cross the Othrys mountains, the plains of western Thessaly and the mountains Antichasia, Chasia and Pindos. Its total length will be 174 km. The concession company is Kentriki Odos SA, which is a joint venture of ACS Group, Ferrovial and GEK Terna. Tendering began in May 2005 and ended on 31 May 2007 with the signing of the contract. The commencement of the 30 years concession period started in March 2008.

The middle section between Xyniada and Trikala was inaugurated and opened to traffic on December 22, 2017. In October 2018 the European Commission approved the funding for the construction of the southern section, Xyniada - Lamia.

History 
The concession agreement for the construction of the project was signed in 2008 and the construction, which began in 2009, lasted 2 years and stopped in 2011 due to the financial crisis. At the end of 2013 the concession agreement was amended and it was decided to proceed to the immediate construction of the central middle section, Trikala - Xyniada, with a length of 80 km and costing 547.000.000 euros, while construction of the northern (Grevena-Trikala) and southern (Xyniada-Lamia) section was postponed.

The middle section between Xyniada and Trikala was inaugurated and opened to traffic on December 22, 2017.

In October 2018, the European Commission approved Greek public funding of €306 million for the construction of the 32,5 km long southern section of Xyniada - Lamia, linking motorways A3 and A1. Subsequently, the concession was sent to the Greek Court of Audit, where it was unanimously approved in early December 2018, and then, on December 20, it was ratified by the Greek Parliament. The construction phase of the 32 km long southern section is currently underway and it is expected to be completed by 2022, while the 3 km long tunnel passing through the Othrys mountain has already been excavated in both sides, as of October 2021. In July 16, 2021, the 15 km section from the A1 interchange outside Lamia to the Karpenisi interchange was opened to traffic, without the Lamia interchange and the Lianokladi rest area. Those will be delivered later, along with the other 17 km of the southern section.

Exit list

References

Motorways in Greece
Roads in Western Macedonia
Roads in Thessaly
Roads in Central Greece